Johannes Samuel Petrus "Johan" Kraag (29 July 1913 – 24 May 1996) was a Surinamese politician who served as the President of Suriname from 29 December 1990, until 16 September 1991.

Political career 
Kraag was a member of the National Party of Suriname. He served as the Chairman of the Estates of Suriname from 1958 to 1963.  In 1963, Kraag joined the Pengel cabinet as Minister of Social Affairs. He was subsequently named Deputy Prime Minister of Suriname as well.  He retired from politics after the 1969 Surinamese general election, although he was still widely respected.  The Surinamese daily  suggested Kraag as a candidate for ambassador to the Netherlands in 1974;  in 1979, the newspaper Nieuwe Leidsche Courant considered him as a potential successor to President Johan Ferrier.

Honorary Chairman 
After democracy was restored in 1987, Kraag accepted the title of "Honorary Chairman" of the NPS.  However, he joined the party's moderate wing, which protested against leader Henck Arron's tight control on internal party decisions. 

On 22 December 1990, Bouterse resigned from the Army after a disagreement with President Ramsewak Shankar. On 24 December a military coup known as the "telephone coup" ousted President Shankar, and Ivan Graanoogst was appointed as Acting President.

President of Suriname 
On 29 December, Kraag was chosen by the National Assembly as President of Suriname. Jules Wijdenbosch, a follower of Bouterse, was appointed Vice President. On 30 December, Kraag approved the Army's request to reinstate Bouterse as Commander of the Army, and Bouterse officially returned on 1 January 1991. On 16 September 1991, Kraag was succeeded by Ronald Venetiaan.

References 

1913 births
1996 deaths
National Party of Suriname politicians
Presidents of Suriname
Surinamese evangelicals
Chairmen of the Estates of Suriname
People from Coronie District